Durganagar is situated on the Northern Suburbs of the Kolkata Metropolitan Area in the city of Kolkata in North 24 Parganas District in the Indian state of West Bengal. It was named after the goddess Durga. It is a part of Kolkata urban area and is under the developmental jurisdiction of Kolkata Metropolitan Development Authority (KMDA). Kolkata Airport is located nearby.

Nimta  and Dum Dum police stations under the Barrackpore Police Commissionerate have jurisdiction over North Dumdum Municipal area.

Kolkata Urban Agglomeration
The following Municipalities, Census Towns and other locations in Barrackpore, subdivision were part of Kolkata Urban Agglomeration in the 2011 census:

Kanchrapara (M)
Jetia (CT)
 Halisahar (M),
Balibhara (CT)
Naihati (M)
Bhatpara (M) 
Kaugachhi (CT)
Garshyamnagar (CT)
Garulia (M)
Ichhapur Defence Estate (CT)
North Barrackpur (M)
Barrackpur Cantonment (CB 
Barrackpore (M)
Jafarpur (CT)
Ruiya (CT)
Titagarh (M) 
Khardaha (M)
Bandipur (CT) 
Panihati (M)
Muragachha (CT) 
New Barrackpore (M) 
Chandpur (CT) 
Talbandha (CT)
 Patulia (CT)
 Kamarhati (M)
 Baranagar (M) 
South Dumdum (M) 
North Dumdum (M) 
Dum Dum (M)
Noapara (CT) 
Babanpur (CT)
Teghari (CT)
Nanna (OG)
 Chakla (OG) 
Srotribati (OG)
Panpur (OG)

Geography

Durganagar (West) has been a part of the North Dum Dum Municipality since 2000, while Durganagar (East) belongs to Dum Dum Municipality. Previously it was known as Sultanpur. Durganagar area situated in the Northern Suburbs of the Kolkata Metropolitan area. Its population is about 50,000. Most of the people are Hindu. About 200–300 Muslims reside in its eastern side.

This place is almost pollution-free in North Dumdum with much green all around. Facilities are adequate, with almost everything nearby. But this environment existed ten years ago, now many flats and buildings are constructed by destroying many playgrounds and ponds. Many trees have been cut down for the construction.

The sudden increase in the population has taken place mainly people from an outsider are settling here because of its proximity to Kolkata Airport (around seven minutes). Durganagar also has good transportation facilities, with good roadways and a local railway section. Durganagar has seen its boost up to access easier transporting communication by means of Belghoria Expressway which runs nearby. Durganagar is connected to Kolkata Airport by bus, taxi, rickshaws, auto-rickshaws, and toto-rickshaws.

Climate

The climate is tropical — like the rest of the Gangetic West Bengal. The hallmark is the monsoon — from early June to mid September. The weather remains dry during the winter (mid-November to mid-February) and humid during summer.

Temperature: 40 °C in May (max) and 10 °C in January (min)

Relative humidity: between 55% in March & 98% in July

Rainfall: 1,579 mm (Normal)

Economy

The locality is near Kolkata International Airport. Durganagar also has good transportation facilities, with roadways and a local railway section.

It has its own post office, Allahabad Bank, AXIS Bank ATM, HDFC ATM, SBI Bank with ATM and UBI Bank with ATM a market and several playgrounds. Almost the whole population is constituted by 4-5 member small families with a single earning member. Many of them are servicemen (state/central govt. jobs), people working in IT industries and Doctors and Engineers. Residents commute daily via local train or by Durganagar Bus stop (Belghoria Expressway also Called Delhi Road) or by autoride to Kolkata International Airport.

There are many local markets on the area. Gorabazar, one of the biggest markets around Kolkata, is situated nearby (eight minutes to Gorabazar). Another big market Nagerbazar is also close to the locality (proximity to go 18 minutes).

Transport

Durganagar also has good transportation facilities, with good roadways and Kolkata Suburban Railway's service (Durganagar railway station). Durganagar has seen its boost up to access easier transporting communication by means of Belghoria Expressway which runs along the northern boundary of Durganagar. Anybody from Durganagar easily go to Howrah Station, Bally Halt, Dankuni, Kona Expressway, Dunlop, Dakhineswar, Dumdum/Kolkata Airport, Madhyamgram, Rajharhat-New Town, Saltlake (Karunamoyee, Sector-V) and different other places through bus, taxi and other vehicles pling on this road. Other areas' people also access this road to different places from its bus stops Sreenagar–Durganagar and Badra–Durganagar. The locality is near Kolkata International Airport (around seven minutes).

Bus

Private Bus
 285 Serampore/Bally Ghat railway station - Salt Lake Sector-V
 DN2/1 Dakshineswar - New Town Shapoorji Housing Estate
 DN44 Dakshineswar - Bangaon
 DN46 Dankuni Housing - Salt Lake Karunamoyee

WBTC Bus
 C23 Dankuni Housing - Park Circus
 S23A Rajchandrapur - Salt Lake Karunamoyee
 AC2B Belgharia Rathtala - Jadavpur Sulekha
 AC23A Rajchandrapur - Salt Lake Karunamoyee
 AC50 Belur Math - Garia
 AC50A Rajchandrapur - Garia
Many unnumbered shuttle buses also pass through Durganagar along Belghoria Expressway.

Education

Durganagar has no colleges. The schools are Bengali Medium and English Medium. Prominent schools include: 
 Durganagar High School
 Nepal Chandra School
 Khalisakota Adarsha Balika Vidyalaya
 Swarnamayee High School
 Nalta Mahajati High School

Culture

Durganagar is named after the goddess Durga. Almost 3–4 Durga Pujas  are set up during the main festive season. The two main ancient Pujas at Durganagar are "Durganagar adibasi brinda", the first is set up at the main (Durganagar sporting club) playground near Durganagar X Roads (Chou Rasta) it is organized by Durganagar Sporting Club and the second is Uttar Durganagar Odibasi brinda, Kolkata:-65 Club set up at the (Saraj Sisu Uddan) near Saha Katgola is mainly organised by the members of Bandhu Milon sangha.

The Durga Pujas now been taken by Kali Pujas. Every summer there is a carnival in the Sporting Club.

People

Bhaskar Ganguly and ex-goalkeeper of Indian football team.

Sports

Football (soccer) is a passion of all citizens, and home of the goalkeeper Bhaskar Ganguly. Football practice and training is often happening in the ground morning and evening. Cricket and karate practice also done by the club on its play ground.

References

External links

 Satellite view

Cities and towns in North 24 Parganas district
Neighbourhoods in North 24 Parganas district
Neighbourhoods in Kolkata
Kolkata Metropolitan Area